Las Cascadas Water Park is a water park, in Aguadilla, Puerto Rico. The park is one of the largest water parks in the Caribbean region. The park is owned and administered by Aguadilla's municipal government.

Las Cascadas opened its doors in 1985 as the only facility of its kind in the Caribbean. The park was built under the municipal administration of Alfredo Gonzalez. The park is now part of the Authority of Municipal Enterprises (AME) of Aguaddilla. AME also administers the Aguadilla Ice Skating Arena. 

The water park was closed since after Hurricane Maria struck Puerto Rico on September 20, 2017. In 2020, Federal Emergency Management Agency assigned over $917,000 in funds to repair the park.

In early 2022, phase 1 of repairs had been completed and the park was set to reopen. In May 2022, a portal for purchasing tickets was available to the public.

List of rides
Activity Pool (Piscina de Actividades) - An activity pool featuring slides and ziplines
Aquatic Tunnel (Túnel Acuático) - Two-person or single tube slides in the dark
Crazy River (Rio Loco) -
Kiddie Pool (Piscina de Niños) - Children's play area
Marine Serpent (Serpiente Marina) -
Speed Slides (Chorreras Rapidas) - Two speedslides
The Maze (El Laberinto) - Crazy experience that seems endless
The Twister (El Torbellino) -
Tropical Lazy River (Rio Tropical Pasivo) - Relaxing experience
Wave Pool (Piscina de Olas) -

References

External links
 

1985 establishments in Puerto Rico
Buildings and structures in Aguadilla, Puerto Rico
Water parks in Puerto Rico